The following is a list of firearms designed in a bullpup (i.e., action behind firecontrol/trigger group) configuration.

References

Bullpup firearms